Frederic Feitshans Jr. (September 10, 1909 - December 21, 1987) was an American film editor. He was nominated for an Academy Award in the category Best Film Editing for the film Wild in the Streets. Feitshans died in December 1987 in Studio City, California, at the age of 78. He was buried in Forest Lawn Memorial Park.

Selected filmography 
 Wild in the Streets (1968; co-nominated with Eve Newman)

References

External links 

1909 births
1987 deaths
People from Los Angeles
American film editors
American television editors
Burials at Forest Lawn Memorial Park (Glendale)